Arthur Charles Valerian Wellesley, 9th Duke of Wellington, 9th Prince of Waterloo, 10th Duke of Ciudad Rodrigo, 9th Duke of Victoria, 9th Marquis of Torres Vedras GE, OBE, DL (born 19 August 1945), styled Earl of Mornington between 1945 and 1972 and Marquess of Douro between 1972 and 2014, is a British peer and politician. He served as Conservative Member of the European Parliament for Surrey (1979–1984) and Surrey West (1984–1989) and sits as a hereditary peer in the House of Lords.

Early life
Wellington was born in 19 August 1945 at H.R.H Princess Christian Hospital in Windsor, Berkshire, the eldest son of Valerian Wellesley, 8th Duke of Wellington and Diana McConnel. He grew up in London and at Stratfield Saye House, his family's estate in Hampshire, and was educated at Ludgrove School, Eton College and Christ Church, Oxford.

Politics
Wellington stood as Conservative candidate for Islington North in 1974, losing to Labour's incumbent Michael O'Halloran. He was a member of Basingstoke Borough Council from 1978 to 1979. He subsequently served as Conservative MEP for Surrey from 1979 to 1984, and as Conservative MEP Surrey West from 1984 to 1989.

In September 2015, he was elected to a seat in the House of Lords as a Conservative in a by-election following the retirement of Lord Luke. On 4 September 2019, he quit the Conservative Party. He sat as a "non-affiliated" member of the House of Lords from September 2019 to September 2020. Since September 2020 he has sat as a Crossbench Peer.

In 2021 he put forward an amendment to the Environment Bill to attempt to reduce pollution from the dumping of sewage in rivers. The initial amendment was rejected by MPs - which led to a backlash on social media. The Environment Secretary George Eustice proposed making measures a legal duty but Wellington put forth the amendment again to attempt to ensure changes came into force.

Charity
Wellington has worked for a number of non-profit or charitable organisations. He was a patron of British Art at the Tate Gallery (1987–90), a member of the Royal College of Art between (1992–97), Chair of British-Spanish Tertulias (1993–98) and Trustee of the Phoenix Trust from 1996 to 2001). He was appointed OBE in 1999 for services to British-Spanish business relations. He was appointed a Deputy Lord-Lieutenant of Hampshire in 1999. In 2003 he was given a four-year appointment as a Commissioner for English Heritage.

On 1 October 2007, he became Chairman of the Governing Council of King's College London, an institution of which his wife Princess Antonia is an alumna, and of which his ancestor Arthur Wellesley, 1st Duke of Wellington, was instrumental in the foundation.

Marriage
He married Princess Antonia of Prussia on 3 February 1977 at St. Paul's Church, Knightsbridge, London. The couple are friends of King Charles III and Queen Camilla.

They have five children:

 Arthur Wellesley, Earl of Mornington (born 31 January 1978); was married (4 June 2005 - August 2020) to former model, now make-up artist Jemma Kidd (born 20 September 1974), fashion stylist and great-granddaughter of Max Aitken, 1st Baron Beaverbrook; they have issue two sons and a daughter
 Lady Honor Victoria Wellesley (born 25 October 1979); married 3 July 2004 (as his second wife) the Honourable Orlando Montagu, younger son of the John Montagu, 11th Earl of Sandwich, and had issue.
 Lady Mary Louise Wellesley (born 16 December 1986).
 Lady Charlotte Anne Wellesley (born 8 October 1990); who attended Oxford University reading archaeology and anthropology. Her day job is at photographer Mario Testino's studio in London, where she is a producer. On 15 July 2015, her engagement was announced to Colombian billionaire Alejandro Santo Domingo, uncle of Tatiana Santo Domingo, wife of Andrea Casiraghi. They married in the duke's family estate Dehesa Baja in Spain, on 28 May 2016, after the ceremony at the sixteenth-century Church of the Incarnation in Illora, near Granada.
 Lord Frederick Charles Wellesley (born 30 September 1992); who attended Eton College. Gained a commission into the Household Cavalry (Blues and Royals) from The Royal Military Academy Sandhurst in December 2016. His engagement to Katherine Lambert was announced on 25 February 2021. They married on 2 July 2022

Titles and styles
Apart from his British titles, the Duke of Wellington also holds the hereditary titles of 9th Prince of Waterloo ("Prins van Waterloo") of both the Kingdom of the Netherlands and the Kingdom of Belgium, and 9th Duke of Victoria ("Duque da Vitória") of the Kingdom of Portugal with its subsidiary titles Marquis of Torres Vedras ("Marquês de Torres Vedras") and Count of Vimeiro ("Conde de Vimeiro"). These were granted to the first Duke as victory titles for his distinguished services as victorious commanding general in the Peninsular War (in Spain and Portugal), and at the Battle of Waterloo (in what is now Belgium).

Wellington is also the 10th Duke of Ciudad Rodrigo ("Duque de Ciudad Rodrigo") of the Kingdom of Spain, which on 10 March 2010 was ceded to him by his father. In accordance with Spanish procedure, Wellington (then styled as Marquess of Douro) made a formal claim to the title with the Spanish Ministry of Justice. King Juan Carlos of Spain, through his minister, granted the succession to the Dukedom of Ciudad Rodrigo to Wellington in May 2010.

References

External links
 
 Duke of Wellington's Regiment – West Riding

1945 births
Living people
People educated at Eton College
Alumni of Christ Church, Oxford
People associated with King's College London
Charles
109
Princes of Waterloo
Officers of the Order of the British Empire
Knights Grand Cross of the Order of Isabella the Catholic
Conservative Party (UK) MEPs
Deputy Lieutenants of Hampshire
109
MEPs for England 1979–1984
MEPs for England 1984–1989
Conservative Party (UK) hereditary peers
Grandees of Spain
Earls of Mornington
People educated at Ludgrove School
Hereditary peers elected under the House of Lords Act 1999